Mien Dong Bus Station, literally East Bus Station, is the largest bus station in Bình Thạnh District, Ho Chi Minh City, Vietnam. This station is the terminus of buses to and from North and Central Vietnam, as well as the provinces east of the city. Ho Chi Minh City is a magnet for immigrants from the North and Central Vietnam, therefore, this coach station is the hub of coach transport for those immigrants. In terms of passengers handled, this is the largest coach station in Vietnam. The station is under the management of the Coach Station PMU which belongs to Ho Chi Minh City Department of Transportation and Public Works.

References 

Transport in Ho Chi Minh City
Buildings and structures in Ho Chi Minh City